Introvertendo (Portuguese for Introvert) is a Brazilian podcast launched in May 2018. The podcast features a group of autistic people discussing the condition and has become popular among the Brazilian autism community.

History
In April 2016, a therapeutic group for people diagnosed with Asperger syndrome, an autism spectrum disorder, was created at the Federal University of Goiás, in Goiânia, Brazil. The group was formed by five people – Luca, Marcos, Michael, Otavio and Tiago – that later became the founders of Introvertendo.

The first Introvertendo episode was released in May 2018. It was the first Brazilian podcast produced by autistic people.

In 2019, Introvertendo hosts started publishing in Revista Autismo.

In 2020,  was no longer an independent production, and started being distributed by Superplayer & Co. In March of the same year, a Brazilian Sign Language version of the podcast was launched.

References

External links 
 

2018 podcast debuts
Works about autism
Audio podcasts